Cat's cradle is a well-known series of string figures.

Cat's cradle may also refer to:

Literature 
 Cat's Cradle, a 1963 novel by Kurt Vonnegut
 Cat's Cradle (Golding novel), a 2011 novel in the Cat Royal series by Julia Golding
 A 1992 series of three novels based on the TV series Doctor Who:
 Cat's Cradle: Time's Crucible, by Marc Platt
 Cat's Cradle: Warhead, by Andrew Cartmel
 Cat's Cradle: Witch Mark, by Andrew Hunt
 "Cat's Cradle", a stage play by Leslie Sands
 Cat's Cradle, a 1925 novel by Maurice Baring

Film and television 
 Cat's Cradle (film), a 1959 film by Stan Brakhage
 "Cat's Cradle" (The Penguins of Madagascar), an episode of The Penguins of Madagascar
 The Cat's Cradle, a 1965 television play by Hugo Charteris, starring Leo Genn

Other uses 
 A microphone shock mount strung in a "cat's cradle" arrangement
 Cat's Cradle (venue), a music venue in Carrboro, North Carolina

See also 
 "Cat's in the Cradle", a song by Harry Chapin
 "Cats in the Cradle" (CSI), an episode of CSI